Azing Griever (born 21 July 1945, Noordbroek) is a Dutch football coach and former goalkeeper.

Playing career
1958–1964 : ZNC (Zuidbroek-Noordbroek Combinatie)
1964–1969 :(GVAV Rap.)
1969–1974 :(SC Heereveen)
1975–1981 :  FC Groningen

Managing career
1984–1989 :  Germanicus
1989–1991 :  Hoogeveen
1992–1995 :  Heracles Almelo
1995–1998 :  FC Emmen
1998–1999 :  BV Veendam
1999 :  FC Emmen
1999–2000 :  BV Veendam
2004–2006 :  Aruba
2010– :  FC Emmen

References

1945 births
Living people
Dutch footballers
Dutch football managers
Dutch expatriate football managers
Association football goalkeepers
FC Groningen players
Heracles Almelo managers
FC Emmen managers
SC Veendam managers
People from Menterwolde
Aruba national football team managers
Footballers from Groningen (province)